Stephen Pohlig (1953-April 14, 2017) was an electrical engineer who worked in the MIT Lincoln Laboratory.  As a graduate student of Martin Hellman's at Stanford University in the mid-1970s, he helped develop the underlying concepts of Diffie-Hellman key exchange, including the Pohlig–Hellman exponentiation cipher and the Pohlig–Hellman algorithm for computing discrete logarithms. That cipher can be regarded as a predecessor to the RSA (cryptosystem) since all that is needed to transform it into RSA is to change the arithmetic from modulo a prime number to modulo a composite number.

In his spare time Stephen Pohlig was a keen kayaker known to many throughout the New England area.

Bibliography

 S. Pohlig and M. Hellman, "An improved algorithm for computing logarithms over GF(p) and its cryptographic significance (Corresp.)," Information Theory, IEEE Transactions on 24, no. 1 (1978): 106-110.
 Martin E. Hellman and Stephen C. Pohlig, "United States Patent: 4424414 - Exponentiation cryptographic apparatus and method," January 3, 1984.
 Boston Globe Obituary, "http://www.legacy.com/obituaries/bostonglobe/obituary.aspx?n=stephen-c-pohlig&pid=185155411&fhid=20778"

References

American electrical engineers
Living people
MIT Lincoln Laboratory people
Computer security academics
1953 births